Ann is a historic town in Douglas County, Missouri, United States. The GNIS classifies it as a populated place. The townsite is located at the junction of state routes EE and AD in the northeast corner of the county. The North Fork River lies just to the east of the site.

A post office called Ann was established in 1898, and remained in operation until 1915. An early postmaster gave the community the name of his daughter.

References

Ghost towns in Missouri
Former populated places in Douglas County, Missouri